Fall River Mills Airport  is a public airport located off Main Street in downtown Fall River Mills, serving Shasta County, northern California, United States.  

The airport has one runway, and is mostly used for general aviation.  It is the only airport within  of Redding and Alturas.

Facilities 
Fall River Mills Airport has one runway:

 Runway 2/20: 5,000 x 75 ft (1,524 x 23 m), surface: asphalt

The airport has nine permanent t-hangars, five portable hangars, and approximately 30 tie-downs. It provides aviation fuel sales. The airport is equipped with runway lights which are designed to be turned on at night by the pilots as they approach.

History
The airport was originally built in the 1940s as Tonkin Field, a location to train pilots for World War II. Over the years, the airport has been maintained and upgraded largely due to funding provided from the California Aid to Airports Program (CAAP).

References 

 Airport Master Record (FAA Form 5010) , also available as a printable form (PDF)

External links
 County of Shasta: official Fall River Mills Airport website

Airports in Shasta County, California
1940 establishments in California